The Singapore Prisons Emergency Action Response (SPEAR) is a department within the Singapore Prison Service (SPS).

SPEAR is a highly-trained elite force that is deployed in various high risk special operations and prepared to quell any riots or fights within the prisons. It assists SPS officers in handling non-compliant inmates, intervening when necessary. Their expertise lies in using softer options like beanbag rounds and soft projectiles. They also share their tactics and insights with other Home Team units, as only SPEAR has this unique expertise.

Every anniversary, on 1 December, SPEAR participates in international competitions such as the Office of Law Enforcement Technology Commercialisation (OLETC) Mock Prison Riot, where they showcase their tactical know-how and learn from counterparts from other leading prisons, correctional and law enforcement agencies. SPEAR did very well in the 2015 Mock Prison Riot, clinching champion and first runner–up titles in the individual and team categories respectively. SPEAR also organises the biennial Asian Prisons Lockdown Challenge (APLC) to enhance tactical capabilities and exchange knowledge in prisons and correctional services in the region.

History
SPEAR was founded on 1 December 1977 as the Special Action Prisons Unit (SAPU). The unit was trained by the Commandos formation of the Singapore Armed Forces (SAF).

Capability
SPEAR officers are specialised in multiple areas, which are essential to make prisons safe in an ever-changing security climate, such as:

 Close-quarters riot control
 Transportation of high risk inmates
 Close protection
 Less lethal weaponry
 Dynamic entry 
 Physical training
 Combat shooting 
 Use of specialised weapons 
 Tactical rappelling 
 Close-quarters battle

Their core functions include responding to prison contingencies and exercises, performing high risk escort duties and training prison officers in various core tactical skills.

Selection process
The selection process for suitable candidates is one of the toughest and most grueling worldwide. Modeled after the elite special forces throughout the world, candidates must go through various physically and mentally demanding challenges. They must also clear a challenging and demanding obstacle course within a stipulated time. Candidates must display grit, resolve, extreme mental and physical fortitude and teamwork to pass the selection.

The five-month long training program is called SPEAR Tactical Course (STC) and it equips officers with the tactical know-how in order to handle crucial situations such as hostage rescues and high-risk escorts. At the start of STC, officers undergo a conditioning phase to bring them to their best physical condition.

A main feature of STC is the close-quarters riot control (CQRC), which sees officers learning an essential skill set that encompasses weapons training, close quarter combat (CQC) and other tactical capabilities. Upon achieving competency in those areas, they will proceed on to harness their ability to execute scenario-based missions.

Before passing out as SPEAR officers, they will embark on a 24 km route march where officers will be tasked with overcoming obstacles along the way within a given time frame.

Equipment
SPEAR force members have access to battering rams and tools for forced entry along with the following weapons:

Pistols
Glock 19
Heckler & Koch USP

Shotguns
Ithaca 37
Remington Model 870

Sub-machine guns
Heckler & Koch MP5
ST Kinetics CPW

Assault rifles
SAR 21
M4 carbine

Less-than-lethal
FN 303

See also
 Correctional emergency response team
 Special Tactics and Rescue (STAR)

References

External links
Official website
Career with the Singapore Prison Service - See "SPEAR specialist" under "Prisons Officer"
Interview with a SPEAR officer

1977 establishments in Singapore
Prisons in Singapore
Non-military counterterrorist organizations
Penal imprisonment in Singapore